is a subway station on the Tokyo Metro Ginza Line in Minato, Tokyo, Japan, operated by the Tokyo subway operator Tokyo Metro.

Station layout
The station has two side platforms serving two tracks.

Platforms

History
The station opened as Aoyama-yonchōme Station on November 18, 1938, and was renamed Gaiemmae in 1939.

The station facilities were inherited by Tokyo Metro after the privatization of the Teito Rapid Transit Authority (TRTA) in 2004.

Surrounding area
 Watari Museum of Contemporary Art
 Itochu
 Avex
 Oracle Corporation Japan
 Aoyama Cemetery
 Meiji Shrine Outer Gardens（）
 Meiji Jingu Stadium (baseball stadium)
 Chichibunomiya Rugby Stadium
 National Olympic Stadium

References

External links

  

Railway stations in Tokyo
Stations of Tokyo Metro
Tokyo Metro Ginza Line
Railway stations in Japan opened in 1938